Phantasmarana apuana is a species of frog in the family Hylodidae.
It is endemic to Brazil.
Its natural habitats are subtropical or tropical moist montane forest and rivers.
It is threatened by habitat loss.

It was formerly placed in the genus Megaelosia, but was reclassified to Phantasmarana in 2021.

References

Apuana
Endemic fauna of Brazil
Amphibians of Brazil
Taxonomy articles created by Polbot
Amphibians described in 2003